is a co-educational private university in Midori, Gunma, Japan. It is run by Kirigaoka Educational Institution originated in Kiryu.

History 
The history of the university can be traced back to 1901, when Kiryu Girls' Sewing School was founded. In 1963 the educational institution established Kirigaoka Women's Junior College, which became co-educational and was renamed Kirigaoka Junior College in 1971. Again the college was renamed Kiryu Junior College in 1989. The junior college was started with only one department (Clothing); in 2008 it consisted of three departments (Living Science, Art & Design, and Nursing).

In 2008 the educational institution established Kiryu University, and the Department of Nursing of the junior college was merged into the university.

Undergraduate schools 
 Faculty of Health Care
 Department of Nutrition
 Department of Nursing

Affiliated schools 
 Kiryu University Junior College (formerly Kiryu Junior College)
 Department of Living Science
 Department of Art and Design
 Kiryu Daiichi High School
 Kiryu University Junior High School
 Kindergarten

References

External links 

  
 Kirigaoka Educational Institution 

Private universities and colleges in Japan
Universities and colleges in Gunma Prefecture
1901 establishments in Japan
Educational institutions established in 1901